Goodwood House is a country house and estate covering  in Westhampnett, Chichester, West Sussex, England and is the seat of the Duke of Richmond. The house was built in about 1600 and is a Grade I listed building.

Description
The house and its grounds are the site of the annual Goodwood Festival of Speed, whilst elsewhere on the estate the Goodwood Circuit motorsport track at Chichester/Goodwood Airport hosts the annual Goodwood Revival, and the airfield has a Flying School. Goodwood Racecourse hosts "Glorious Goodwood" and a number of other (horse) race meetings. The estate includes two golf courses and a cricket pitch, home to Goodwood Cricket Club, a hotel and a  organic farm. The estate employs over 550 people and attracts 800,000 visitors a year. The headquarters of Rolls-Royce Motor Cars is on the Estate.

The Monarch's Way long-distance footpath crosses the downs from west to east, passing immediately south of the racecourse.

The landscaped park and woodlands of Goodwood are Grade I listed on the Register of Historic Parks and Gardens.

History

Goodwood House was built circa 1600 and was acquired by Charles Lennox, 1st Duke of Richmond in 1697. A South wing was added by Matthew Brettingham and a North wing by James Wyatt. It may be that there was an intention to build the house in a unique octagonal layout, but only three of the eight sides were built and that intention has never been proven.

Charles Lennox, 3rd Duke of Richmond commissioned Sir William Chambers to design the stable block in 1757 and James Wyatt to design the Kennels, originally for use by the Duke's hunting hounds but now used as a golf club house, in 1787. He also commissioned Goodwood Racecourse, which was established in 1802.

The Goodwood Golf Course was laid out in 1901. Chichester/Goodwood Airport was built during the Second World War. Goodwood Circuit was laid out around the perimeter of the airfield by Frederick Gordon-Lennox, 9th Duke of Richmond in 1948.

In 1982, the Goodwood estate played host to the World Road Cycling Championships.

A large collection of documents from the Goodwood Estate Archives (1418–1984) is held by West Sussex Record Office.

References

External links

 Goodwood House entry from The DiCamillo Companion to British & Irish Country Houses
Brochure with a few pictures of the house

Buildings and structures in Chichester
Goodwood estate
Country houses in West Sussex
Historic house museums in West Sussex
Art museums and galleries in West Sussex
Grade I listed buildings in West Sussex
Grade I listed houses
Grade I listed parks and gardens in West Sussex
Defunct real tennis venues